Lisa Maria Potthoff (born 25 July 1978) is a German actress.

Career
Potthoff grew up in Munich, where she also completed her acting training at Schauspiel München. Even before and during her apprenticeship, she had her first roles in various television series from 1995, such as Polizeiruf 110 and SOKO 5113. On television, she had leading roles in Bitter Innocence, Holstein Lovers, A Christmas Tale, Summer Wind, Blond: Eva Blond!, Death Is No Proof and alongside Herbert Knaup in The Inspector's Daughter. In recent years, Potthoff has also played leading roles in films, including as "Braut Sophie" in the black comedy , as "Nadja" in Soloalbum, as "Susanne", manager of a gay soccer team, in Guys and Balls and as Eleonore Schikaneder in Marcus H. Rosenmüller's . Since 2013 she has played the role of Susi in the homeland crime film series about the police officer Franz Eberhofer, based on the book series by Rita Falk.

Personal life
Potthoff lives in Munich and has two children.

References

External links 

 

1978 births
Living people
Actresses from Berlin
German film actresses
German television actresses
20th-century German actresses
21st-century German actresses